Unknown Territory may refer to:
 Unknown Territory (Bomb the Bass album)
 Unknown Territory (Dick Dale album)